Naoya Tsukahara (Japanese:塚原 直也 Tsukahara Naoya, born June 25, 1977) is a former Japanese artistic gymnast and 2004 Olympic Gold Medalist  now coaching and competing for Australia. He is the son of the former Japanese gymnast, Mitsuo Tsukahara, who was also a multiple gold medalist in the Olympic Games during the 1960s and 70s. He competed at the 1996, 2000 and 2004 Olympics as well as many World Championships for team Japan from 1996 until 2006. In 2009, he moved to Australia, gaining citizenship in 2012, and currently represents Australia's national gymnastics team, most recently competing at the 2014 Glasgow Commonwealth Games.

Competitive History

Late 1990s 
Naoya participated at the 1996 Olympics in Atlanta. The Japanese team finished 10th in the team final. Individually, Naoya qualified into the all-around final and finished 12th in the final.

Although Naoya did not get any medal in the 1996 Olympics, he had been quite successful after that. In the 1997 World Championships, he won two bronze medals in the all-around and on parallel bars. In the 1999 World Championships, he had pushed himself to a higher level of success, winning silver medals in all-around and on parallel bars.

2000 Summer Olympics 
Following his successes at the World Championships, Naoya eventually came to his second Olympic Games, the 2000 Olympics in Sydney. This time the Japanese gymnastics team was edged by the Russian team for a bronze medal. Individually, Naoya qualified 6th and 10th into the horizontal bar and all-around final respectively. He finally finished 18th in all-around final, and a fall in the horizontal bar final made him come last, with a score of 8.825.

2001–2003 
After the 2000 Summer Olympics, Naoya could not regain his form of 2000. In addition, there were some fabulous gymnasts rose in Japan, including Hiroyuki Tomita, Isao Yoneda and Takehiro Kashima. Naoya's character in the national team changed from an all-around competitor into an anchor for the Japanese gymnastics team.

In the 2003 World Championships, Naoya made it into the all-around and parallel bars finals, finishing 7th in the all-around while his teammate, Hiroyuki Tomita, won a bronze in that event. Individually, Naoya placed 4th on his strongest event, parallel bars with a score of 9.675.

2004 Summer Olympics 
Naoya made the 2004 Summer Olympics held in Athens, Greece. The Japanese team showed strong performances and eventually won the team gold medal. Naoya placed 4th on floor exercise in prelim with a 9.725, the same score of his teammates, Isao Yoneda and Daisuke Nakano. However, the tie-breaker policy favoured his two teammates into the final. He did not qualify into the all-around final.

After the 2004 Summer Olympics 
Naoya was 27 when the Olympics in Athens wrapped, which was an age considered 'old' for gymnastics. Nevertheless, he kept competing. He won a bronze medal with the team in the 2006 World Championships but could not make the 2008 Summer Olympics. He was still competing as of Summer 2010.

Competing For Australia 
In 2009, he moved to Australia, competing and winning at the 2009, 2010, 2011, and 2013 Australian National Gymnastics Championships, and winning 2nd place behind Joshua Jefferis in 2012. In 2012, he gained Australian citizenship, allowing him to compete representing Australia in international competitions. However, the process was not completed in time for qualification to the 2012 Olympic Games. In 2013, he competed at the 2013 World Championships, narrowly missing the all-around finals, but premiering two new variations of the V-cross on still rings. FIG later announced the Li Ning 2 to V-cross as the "Tsukahara," named after the athlete. This rare honor for a gymnast is one his father also experienced multiple times. He also competed in the 2014 Commonwealth Games in Glasgow, UK.

In March 2016, Tsukahara retired.

References

External links 
  
 
 
 

1977 births
Living people
Japanese male artistic gymnasts
Medalists at the World Artistic Gymnastics Championships
Olympic gymnasts of Japan
Gymnasts at the 1996 Summer Olympics
Gymnasts at the 2000 Summer Olympics
Gymnasts at the 2004 Summer Olympics
Olympic gold medalists for Japan
Olympic medalists in gymnastics
Asian Games medalists in gymnastics
Gymnasts at the 1998 Asian Games
Gymnasts at the 2002 Asian Games
Gymnasts at the 2014 Commonwealth Games
Australian male artistic gymnasts
Australian people of Japanese descent
Commonwealth Games competitors for Australia
Medalists at the 2004 Summer Olympics
Asian Games bronze medalists for Japan
Medalists at the 1998 Asian Games
Medalists at the 2002 Asian Games
Universiade medalists in gymnastics
Universiade gold medalists for Japan
Universiade silver medalists for Japan
Medalists at the 1997 Summer Universiade
20th-century Japanese people
21st-century Japanese people